ULCA may refer to:

 United Lutheran Church in America